The 1934 Brooklyn Dodgers season was their fifth in the league. The team failed to improve on their previous season's output of 5–4–1, winning only four games. They failed to qualify for the playoffs for the third consecutive season.

Schedule

Standings

References

Brooklyn Dodgers (NFL) seasons
Brooklyn Dodgers (NFL)
Brooklyn
1930s in Brooklyn
Flatbush, Brooklyn